Two Tigers is a popular traditional Mandarin nursery rhyme called "Liang Zhi Lao Hu" in Mandarin.  Variations adopt the tune of the French melody Frère Jacques.

Lyrics

Lyrics in Chinese characters
两只老虎，
两只老虎，
跑得快，
跑得快，
一只没有眼睛， (or: 一只没有耳朵)
一只没有尾巴，
真奇怪，
真奇怪。

Lyrics in pinyin 

Liǎng zhī lǎohǔ, 
Liǎng zhī lǎohǔ, 		
Pǎo de kuài,  	 	
Pǎo de kuài, 	 	
Yī zhī méiyǒu yǎnjing (or: Yī zhī méiyǒu ěrduo)
Yī zhī méiyǒu wěiba, 	 	
Zhēn qí guài, 	 	
Zhēn qí guài.

English translation 

 Two little tigers,
 Two little tigers,
(They) run very fast,
(They) run very fast,
 One has no eyes (or: One has no ears), 
 One has no tail,
 Very weird,
 Very weird.

Other English translation 
 Little tigers, little tigers
 Run so fast, run so fast.
 Tell me where you’re going,
 Tell me where you’re going.
 Let me know, let me know.
 Little tigers, little tigers
 Pass me by, pass me by.
 Have you lost your mama?
 Have you lost your papa?
 Tell me why, tell me why.

References 

Chinese nursery rhymes
Chinese children's songs
Chinese folk songs
Traditional children's songs
Fictional tigers
Fictional duos
Songs about cats
Songs about mammals